Swanson's law is the observation that the price of solar photovoltaic modules tends to drop 20 percent for every doubling of cumulative shipped volume. At present rates, costs go down 75% about every 10 years.

Origin 
It is named after Richard Swanson, the founder of SunPower Corporation, a solar panel manufacturer. The term Swanson's Law appears to have originated with an article in The Economist published in late 2012. Swanson had been presenting such curves at technical conferences for several years. It is a misnomer in that Swanson was not the first person to make this observation.

Swanson's law has been compared to Moore's law, which predicts the growing computing power of processors. Swanson's Law is a solar industry specific application of the more general Wright's Law which states there will be a fixed cost reduction for each doubling of manufacturing volume.

Technical Background 
The method used by Swanson is more commonly referred to as learning curve or more precise experience curve analysis. It was first developed and applied to the aeronautics industry in 1936 by Theodore Paul Wright. There are reports of it first being applied to the photovoltaics industry in 1975, and saw wider use starting in the early 1990s.

Crystalline silicon photovoltaic cell prices have fallen from $76.67 per watt in 1977 to $0.36 per watt in 2014. Plotting the module price (in $/Wp) versus time shows a dropping by 10% per year.

See also
 Economies of scale
 Growth of photovoltaics
 Learning curve
 Log–log plot
 Moore's law
 Photovoltaic system
 Wright's Law

References

Photovoltaics
Rules of thumb